Chen Qiang (1918 – 26 June 2012) was a Chinese film and stage actor and comedian best known for his performances as villains/antagonists in The Red Detachment of Women, The White Haired Girl and Devils on the Doorstep. Chen began his career as an actor in 1947 and has played more than 40 different characters since then.

His second son, Chen Peisi, is also a well-known actor and comedian.

Biography
Chen was born Chen Qingsan to a poor family in Xujiahe Township of Ningjin County, in Hebei province. When he was a child, he relocated to Taiyuan, Shanxi with his parents. In 1936, he attended Taiyuan Youth Theatre and Xinsheng Theatre; both were progressive groups organized by the Communist Party of China. In 1938, he went to Yan'an to study acting at Lu Xun Academy of Arts. After graduating in 1939 he joined the Song and Dance Troupe of Shanxi-Chahaer-Hebei Border Region.

Chen joined the Chinese Communist Party in 1942, and made his comedy debut in The Second Uncle.

In 1945, he was cast as Huang Shiren, the despotic landlord, in the ballet play The White Haired Girl.  His performance was so convincing, that an emotionally invested soldier in the audience almost shot him with a rifle in anger.

In 1947, he was an actor in Dongbei Film Studio, that same year, he participated in Leave Him to Fight Jiang.

In 1949, after the founding of the Communist State, he appeared as Lao Houtou, an old worker in The Bridge, which is the first feature film in the People's Republic. He also played as Yang Mingqing in The White Warrior.

He was transferred to Beijing Film Studio in 1953. At the same year, he appeared in the film Marriage.

In 1958 he starred in two films, He Beauty in the Picture and No Mystery Three Years Ago. And he had a supporting role in the film A Visit to Relatives.

In 1961, he starred as Nan Batian in Xie Jin's film The Red Detachment of Women, which earned him a Best Supporting Actor Award at the 1st Hundred Flowers Awards and a Best Actor Award at the 3rd Asian - African Film Festival, in Indonesia, 1964.

In 1982, Chen Qiang co-starred with his son Chen Peisi in Sunset Street.

In 1986, he played the lead role as Laokui in the comedy film Father and Son.

In 1995, he won the Best Supporting Actor Award at the 13th Golden Eagle Awards for his performance in When Something Amazing Happens.

On September 13, 2008, Chen won the Lifetime Achievement Award at the 29th Hundred Flowers Awards.

On June 26, 2012, Chen died of apoplexy at Anzhen Hospital, in Beijing.

Personal life
Chen had two sons, Chen Buda and Chen Peisi, and a daughter, Chen Lida.

Filmography

Awards

References

1918 births
2012 deaths
People from Xingtai
Chinese male film actors
Male actors from Hebei
Deaths from bleeding
20th-century Chinese male actors
21st-century Chinese male actors
Chinese communists
Burials at Babaoshan Revolutionary Cemetery